Juan Diego González Alzate (22 September 1980 – circa 27 February 2020) was a Colombian footballer.

Career
González began his career in the youth ranks of Envigado. After an impressive start to his career in Colombia, González moved to Argentina joining Almagro in 2000. In 2001, he joined top club San Lorenzo and helped the Argentine side capture the Copa Mercosur that same year. After a brief stay with San Lorenzo he returned to Colombia and his original club  Envigado.

The following seasons he would play for various Colombian clubs before joining Mexican club Santos Laguna for a brief spell in 2006. The following season, he returned to Colombia and joined Once Caldas. In 2007, he joined La Equidad and was a prominent member of the squad appearing in 56 league matches and helping his club capture the Colombian Cup in 2008. On 5 August 2010, he signed with the Philadelphia Union. He was waived by Philadelphia on 23 November 2011.

He has played for more than ten clubs throughout his senior career, including clubs in Colombia, Argentina, Mexico and the United States.

Death
González was found dead in the Medellín River on 27 February 2020. His dismembered body was identified on 5 March. His body was found along with a second victim, a 19-year-old man identified as Deiber Galeano.

Honors

Club
San Lorenzo
International Mercosur Cup: 2001
La Equidad
Colombian Cup: 2008

References

External links
 
 

1980 births
2020 deaths
Colombian footballers
Envigado F.C. players
Independiente Medellín footballers
Club Almagro players
San Lorenzo de Almagro footballers
Independiente Santa Fe footballers
Once Caldas footballers
Santos Laguna footballers
La Equidad footballers
Deportivo Pereira footballers
Philadelphia Union players
Colombian expatriate footballers
Expatriate footballers in Argentina
Expatriate footballers in Mexico
Expatriate soccer players in the United States
Categoría Primera A players
Major League Soccer players
Liga MX players
Association football defenders
Footballers from Medellín
Colombian murder victims
Male murder victims
People murdered in Colombia